Targionia may refer to a genus of:

 Targionia (plant), a liverwort
 Targonia (insect), a plant scale in the Targioniina tribe, of the Coccoidea